Events from the year 1738 in Denmark.

Incumbents
 Monarch – Christian VI
 Prime minister – Johan Ludvig Holstein-Ledreborg

Events

Undated

Births
Enevold Brandt - Danish courtier (d. 1772)

Deaths
 11 June - Caspar Bartholin the Younger, anatomist (born 1655)
 18 November – Hendrick Krock, painter to the Danish Court (born 1671)

Full date unknown
 March - Margrethe Lasson, (first ever Danish) novelist (born 1659)

References

 
1730s in Denmark
Denmark
Years of the 18th century in Denmark